Lemonade is the sixth studio album by American singer Beyoncé. It was released on April 23, 2016, by Parkwood Entertainment and Columbia Records, accompanied by a 65-minute film of the same title. It is Beyoncé's second visual album, following her self-titled fifth studio album (2013), and a concept album with a song cycle that relates Beyoncé's emotional journey after her husband's infidelity in a generational and racial context. Primarily an R&B and art pop album, Lemonade encompasses a variety of genres, including reggae, blues, rock, hip hop, soul, funk, Americana, country, gospel, electronic, and trap. It features guest vocals from James Blake, Kendrick Lamar, the Weeknd, and Jack White, and contains samples and interpolations of a number of hip hop and rock songs.

Lemonade received universal critical acclaim, and is the most acclaimed studio album of Beyoncé's career. The album was music critics' top album of 2016, and was named the greatest album of the 2010s by publications such as the Associated Press. In 2020, the album was placed at number 32 on Rolling Stone's 500 Greatest Albums of All Time list. The album was nominated for nine Grammy Awards at the 59th Annual Grammy Awards (2017), including Album of the Year, Record of the Year and Song of the Year. It won Best Urban Contemporary Album and Best Music Video. The album's visuals received 11 nominations at the 2016 MTV Video Music Awards, of which it won eight including Breakthrough Long Form Video and Video of the Year. The film also received four nominations at the 68th Primetime Emmy Awards. The album won a Peabody Award in Entertainment.

Lemonade topped the charts in various countries worldwide, including the US Billboard 200, where it earned 653,000 with additional album-equivalent units, including 485,000 copies in its first week of sales. It has since been certified triple platinum by the Recording Industry Association of America (RIAA). By the end of 2016, Lemonade had sold over 1.5 million copies in the United States, making it the third-best-selling album of the year in the US, and it was the best-selling album of 2016, according to the International Federation of the Phonographic Industry (IFPI), with 2.5 million copies sold worldwide. The album was supported by five singles: "Formation", which was a top-ten hit on the US Billboard Hot 100, "Sorry", "Hold Up", "Freedom", and "All Night". In April 2016, Beyoncé embarked on The Formation World Tour to promote the album, an all-stadium tour visiting North America and Europe.

Background 
On February 6, 2016, Beyoncé released "Formation" for free on the music streaming service Tidal and its accompanying music video on her official YouTube account. The following day, Beyoncé performed "Formation" during her performance at the Super Bowl 50 halftime show. Immediately after the performance, a commercial aired announcing The Formation World Tour, which kicked off in Miami, Florida on April 27, 2016, with the first pre-sales going on sale just two days after the announcement on February 9, 2016. Beyoncé was both praised and criticized over her "Formation" and the Black Panther-influenced costume for her Super Bowl halftime performance. As a result of this, the hashtags "#BoycottBeyonce" and "#IStandWithBeyonce" began trending on social media platforms such as Twitter and Beyoncé faced boycotts from police unions. A group of protesters planned to stage an "anti-Beyoncé" rally outside of the NFL's headquarters in New York City, New York on the day general sale of tickets went for sale, but no protesters showed up; instead, dozens of Beyoncé supporters held a rally for her.

When asked what she wanted to accomplish with the next phase of her career in an interview with Elle, published on April 4, 2016, Beyoncé said: "I hope I can create art that helps people heal. Art that makes people feel proud of their struggle. Everyone experiences pain, but sometimes you need to be uncomfortable to transform."

Recording and production 
Lemonade was recorded between June 2014 and July 2015 across 11 studios in the United States. Beyoncé had the idea to write each song corresponding to the eleven chapters that can be seen in the Lemonade film, and posted moodboards around the studio representing each chapter to provide direction to her collaborators. Beyoncé and her collaborators also played music in the studio to inspire each other. The album was written in stages, with Beyoncé retreating to her home to work on the recordings with recording and mixing engineer Stuart White, as well as to take care of her daughter. The process began at the Record Plant in Los Angeles, which the team used for a month. They then took a break, and later went to Paris for 45 days. The team stayed in a hotel and set up two studios in two different hotel rooms, one for Beyoncé and one for Jay-Z. Jay-Z recounted how he and Beyoncé recorded music both separately and together, describing it as "using our art almost like a therapy session" after his infidelity. The music that Beyoncé recorded separately was what became Lemonade and was released first.

Lemonade was produced through Beyoncé's synthesis of the work of many collaborators, including both popular and lesser known artists. MNEK relayed how "Hold Up" was written, saying "The way Beyoncé works, the song is a jigsaw piece and then she will piece various elements. It could be a bit that she's written, a bit that someone else has written and she’ll make that the bridge; a bit I've written she'll make the middle eight". MNEK also explains that Beyoncé was "overlooking everything, saying "I like this, I like that, this is how this should sound, this is how that should sound."" "Don't Hurt Yourself" collaborator Jack White describes how "she took just sort of a sketch of a lyrical outline and turned into the most bodacious, vicious, incredible song... I'm so amazed at what she did with it." "Hold Up" and "Sorry" co-writer and co-producer MeLo-X explains that "she has a way of creating that I’ve never seen before as an artist. She produces, alters and arranges tracks in ways I wouldn’t think of." When talking about how he scored the Lemonade film as well, MeLo-X explains "She's hands on with everything. She gives direction on everything and is very involved with the whole process. It's inspiring to see an artist on that level be able to just still have an eye for certain things and an ear... We would just sit down and go over with different things and different scenes and sounds and kind of put it together piece by piece."

Themes 

As a multimedia audiovisual artwork, Lemonade relates the emotional journey of Beyoncé after her husband Jay-Z's infidelity in a generational and racial context through its music, lyrics, visuals and poetry. The Lemonade album is a song cycle (referencing the classical compositional genre defined in German Lieder by Robert Schumann, Franz Schubert and Johannes Brahms) that is performed as an elaboration of the Kübler-Ross model, with the tracks (excluding "Formation") corresponding to the eleven chapters of the Lemonade film: "Intuition", "Denial", "Anger", "Apathy", "Emptiness", "Accountability", "Reformation", "Forgiveness", "Resurrection", "Hope", and "Redemption".

Melina Matsoukas, the director of the "Formation" music video, said that Beyoncé explained to her the concept behind Lemonade, stating: "She wanted to show the historical impact of slavery on black love, and what it has done to the black family, and black men and women—how we're almost socialized not to be together." Beyoncé wrote on this in a 2018 Vogue article about the "generational curses" in her family, explaining that she comes "from a lineage of broken male-female relationships, abuse of power, and mistrust", including a slave owner who married a slave. Beyoncé continues, writing "Only when I saw that clearly was I able to resolve those conflicts in my own relationship. Connecting to the past and knowing our history makes us both bruised and beautiful."

This theme is repeated throughout Lemonade, with Beyoncé's grief, trauma and struggle being connected to that of her family's ancestors. The sixth track "Daddy Lessons" acts as a turning point for the album, with Beyoncé linking Jay-Z cheating on her with her father Mathew Knowles cheating on her mother Tina. Towards the end of Lemonade, Beyoncé reveals the meaning behind the album title, showing Jay-Z's grandmother Hattie White saying "I had my ups and downs, but I always find the inner strength to pull myself up. I was served lemons, but I made lemonade", and describing her own grandmother, Agnez Deréon, as an "alchemist" who "spun gold out of this hard life" with the instructions to overcome these challenges passed down through generations like a lemonade recipe.

Black feminism 
Miriam Bale for Billboard called Lemonade "a revolutionary work of Black feminism" as "a movie made by a black woman, starring Black women, and for Black women", in which Beyoncé is seen gathering, uniting and leading Black women throughout the film. As well as relating the story of Beyoncé's relationship with her husband, Lemonade also chronicles the relationship between Black women and American society. This includes how the United States betrayed and continually mistreats Black women, with society needing to solve its problems in order to enable reformation and the rehabilitation of Black women. As part of reverting the societal oppression and silencing of Black women, Lemonade centralizes the experiences of Black women in a way that is not often seen in the media, and celebrates their achievements despite the adversity they face.

"Don't Hurt Yourself" contains a quote from Malcolm X in which he said "The most disrespected person in America is the Black woman. The most unprotected person in America is the Black woman. The most neglected person in America is the Black woman". The Black female public figures that Beyoncé featured in the film all have successful careers despite experiencing misogynoir and racism in the media. The film also contains clips of everyday Black women from working class communities, bringing visibility to Black women who are often ignored and undermined by society. The film envisions a space where there was never oppression of Black women, whereby Beyoncé and other Black women form a self-sufficient community in which they can heal together. Lemonade also defies and dismantles stereotypical representations of Black women as monolithic and angry Black women, instead attributing them complexity, agency, strength and vulnerability.

To create Lemonade, Beyoncé drew from the work of a wide variety of Black women who are often overlooked or forgotten. The music draws inspiration from Black female blues musicians such as Shug Avery, Bessie Smith and Sister Rosetta Tharpe, who also used their personal trauma to empower Black women, as well as samples songs originally recorded by Black women, namely Memphis Minnie and Dionne Warwick, but whose most famous recordings are by male or white artists. The visuals drew inspiration from works by Black feminists such as Julie Dash's Daughters Of The Dust, Alice Walker's In Search Of Our Mothers' Gardens, and Toni Morrison's The Bluest Eye. Other influences for Lemonade include literary work by Black women focusing on themes including African-American folklore (such as Zora Neale Hurston's Their Eyes Were Watching God) and Afrofuturism (such as Octavia Butler's Kindred).

African-American culture 
Beyoncé also uses Lemonade as a form of recognition, commemoration and celebration of the culture and history of Black people in the Deep South and in the United States as a whole. The film contains allusions to slavery, such as the House of Slaves' Door of No Return in Senegal and the dungeons of Elmina Castle in Ghana, where slaves were taken before being shipped to the Americas. In "Love Drought", Beyoncé walks with her dancers into the sea, alluding to the Igbo Landing of 1803, where Igbo slaves took control of their slave ship, and rather than submit to slavery, marched into the sea while singing in Igbo, drowning themselves. Beyoncé appears wearing a tignon, in reference to Louisiana's tignon laws implemented in 1786 that limited African-American women's dress in order to maintain the state's racist social hierarchies. The film also contains references to African religion and spirituality, such as Yoruba ori body paint in "Sorry", allusions to the loa Erzulie Red-Eyes in "Don't Hurt Yourself", and Beyoncé's initiation into the Santería religion and embodiment of the Yoruba orisha Oshun in "Hold Up". Allusions to New Orleans culture include "Queen of Creole cuisine" Leah Chase, the Edna Karr Marching Band, jazz funerals, Mardi Gras Indians and the Superdome.

Beyoncé is seen with other Black women on plantations in Lemonade. In the "Formation" video, the walls of the plantation houses are covered with French Renaissance-style portraits of Black subjects; director Melina Matsoukas states that "films about slavery traditionally feature white people in these roles of power and position. I wanted to turn those images on their head." Towards the end of Lemonade, Beyoncé and several Black women are on a plantation, with Chris Kelly for Fact writing "Instead of an antebellum memory, these scenes portray a dream: the fantasy of an all-Black, matriarchal utopia when women dress up, prepare meals, take photographs and perform shows, not for a master but for themselves." Throughout the film, Beyoncé can be seen in Fort Macomb, a Confederate States Army stronghold that was taken over by one of the first all-Black Union Army units – the 1st Louisiana Native Guard – and eventually destroyed by Hurricane Katrina. On the central track "Daddy Lessons", Beyoncé is seen standing in a hideaway in the fort, alluding to the Underground Railroad. However, on the closer "All Night", Beyoncé is seen above ground, walking on top of the ruins of the fort in an antebellum-style dress made in West African material, possibly inspired by artist Yinka Shonibare who is known for reappropriating "European import — the cloth — to remake symbols of European cultural dominance in the spirit of Africa".

On "Don't Hurt Yourself", Beyoncé samples Led Zeppelin’s "When the Levee Breaks". However, the classic rock song was originally written by black Delta blues artists Kansas Joe McCoy and Memphis Minnie, with the song referring to the Great Mississippi Flood of 1927 which displaced hundreds of thousands of African Americans. With the sample, Beyoncé reappropriates the song that was written by Black people about black history. In general, Beyoncé also reappropriates genres that were influenced by African Americans that are now seen as predominantly white genres on Lemonade, such as rock in "Don't Hurt Yourself" and country in "Daddy Lessons".

Music and lyrics 
The album features musicians Jack White, Kendrick Lamar, and bassist Marcus Miller, and sampling from folk music collectors John Lomax, Sr. and his son Alan Lomax on "Freedom". Beyoncé and her team reference the musical memories of all those periods, including a brass band, stomping blues rock, ultraslow avant-R&B, preaching, a prison song (both collected by John and Alan Lomax), and the sound of the 1960s fuzz-tone guitar psychedelia (sampling the Puerto Rican band Kaleidoscope).
The Washington Post called the album a "surprisingly furious song cycle about infidelity and revenge". The Chicago Tribune described the album as not just a mere grab for popular music dominance, rather it is a retrospective that allows the listener to explore Beyoncé's personal circumstances, with musical tones from the southern United States, a harkening back towards her formative years spent in Texas. AllMusic wrote that Beyoncé "delights in her Blackness, femininity, and Southern origin with supreme wordplay."

According to The A.V. Club, the tracks "encompass and interpolate the entire continuum of R&B, rock, soul, hip hop, pop, and blues", accomplished by a deft precision "blurring eras and references with determined impunity." The Guardian and Entertainment Weekly both noted that the album touches on country, and Entertainment Weekly noticed the use of avant-garde musical elements. Consequence of Sound wrote that the album's genres span "from gospel to rock to R&B to trap"; On the album, Isaac Hayes and Andy Williams are among the sampled artists.
PopMatters noticed how the album was nuanced in its theme of anger and betrayal with vast swathes of the album bathed in political context; however, it is still a pop album at its essence with darker and praiseworthy tones. In 2020, Marc Hogan from Pitchfork considered Lemonade among the great art pop albums of the last 20 years to "have filled the void of full-length statements with both artistic seriousness and mass appeal that was formerly largely occupied by [rock] guitar bands".

Title and artwork 
There are two suggested inspirations for the album's title. The song "Freedom" includes at its end an audio recording of Hattie White, grandmother of Beyoncé's husband Jay-Z's, telling a crowd at her ninetieth birthday party in December 2015: "I had my ups and downs, but I always find the inner strength to pull myself up. I was served lemons, but I made lemonade", referencing the proverb "when life gives you lemons, make lemonade" that encourages turning sourness and difficulty to something positive. Beyoncé also draws a connection to her own grandmother, Agnez Deréon, using her lemonade recipe that was passed down through the generations as a metaphor for the mechanisms for healing passed through generations.

The cover artwork for Lemonade is from the music video shot for "Don't Hurt Yourself" and features Beyoncé wearing cornrows and a fur coat, leaning against a Chevrolet Suburban and covering her face with her arm.

Release and promotion 

Lemonade was first made available for online streaming via Tidal on April 23, 2016, through Parkwood Entertainment and Columbia Records, and for digital download the following day. It was released for CD and DVD on May 6, 2016. A limited edition box set titled How to Make Lemonade was made available for pre-order on August 18, 2017, containing a six-hundred-page coffee table book, featuring a set of pictures and behind-the-scenes content showcasing the making of the album, and a double vinyl LP of Lemonade. Standalone vinyl was released on September 15, 2017. Upon its release, Lemonade was only available to stream on Tidal; however the album was eventually released to all other streaming platforms on April 23, 2019, exactly three years after its release. The version of the album that was made available on other streaming services contains the original audio part of Lemonade as well as the original demo of "Sorry".

Beyoncé had a goal to perform the entire Lemonade album live. Beyoncé performed "Formation" at the Super Bowl 50 halftime show as part of her guest appearance at the event, with critics lauding the performance and stating that she stole the show from headliners Coldplay. The political symbolism in the performance also inspired many thinkpieces and discussions on their history and significance.
Beyoncé performed "Freedom" with Kendrick Lamar as the surprise opening number at the 2016 BET Awards on June 27. The performance began with an audio clip of Martin Luther King Jr.'s "I Have a Dream" speech. The performance was met with acclaim by critics. At the 2016 MTV Video Music Awards on August 28, Beyoncé performed a sixteen-minute medley of "Pray You Catch Me", "Hold Up", "Sorry", "Don't Hurt Yourself", and "Formation", and included interludes of the poetry as heard in the Lemonade film. Critics noted that Beyoncé used political symbolism during "Pray You Catch Me", which included angel-like dancers in historical black hairstyles (such as Bantu knots, braids and dreadlocks) successively falling to the ground as though shot, alluding to police brutality, and a black man in a black hoodie catching, uplifting and pushing Beyoncé forward, alluding to Trayvon Martin, who was killed when wearing a black hoodie.

On October 19, Beyoncé performed "6 Inch" and "All Night" at the TIDAL X benefit concert at Barclays Center in Brooklyn, New York City. On November 2, Beyoncé performed "Daddy Lessons" with the Dixie Chicks at the 50th Annual Country Music Association Awards (2016). The performance (which was the first featuring the Dixie Chicks in a decade after being blacklisted for their criticism of George W Bush in 2003) was widely praised by critics, but was met with criticism and racism by conservative country fans; this sparked conversations about the identity of country music and black people's place in it. Subsequently, a remix of "Daddy Lessons" featuring the Dixie Chicks was released. At the 59th Annual Grammy Awards on February 12, 2017, Beyoncé performed "Love Drought" and "Sandcastles". Themed around motherhood, the five-months pregnant Beyoncé's performance is recognised by commentators to evoke various female deities and Renaissance European Christian art (such as Tintoretto's Last Supper, Simone Martini's Maestà and depictions of the Virgin of Guadalupe) and various non-European allusions such as Fulani facepainting, Ethiopian icons, Byzantine jewelry and Latin American Baroque painting.

In order to promote the album, Beyoncé embarked on The Formation World Tour which visited countries in North America and Europe from April to October 2016. The stage featured the Es Devlin-designed 'Monolith', a revolving seven-storey-tall box made with video screen walls that could shoot out fire and fireworks and split open, and which revolved during the show to represent a new chapter in line with the Lemonade film.
The Formation World Tour was met with rave reviews from critics, such as Kat Bein for Rolling Stone who described the show as "a prime example of entertainment and a vision of an artist at her apex" and "a visual feast as well as an emotional tour de force, packed with fireworks, confetti, rearranging stage designs and aerial dancers." The Formation World Tour won Tour of the Year at the 2016 American Music Awards, was included in Rolling Stone's 50 Greatest Concerts of the Last 50 Years list in 2017, and was named the best tour of the decade (2010s) by Consequence of Sound in 2019.

The Formation World Tour was ranked at number one and number two on Pollstar's 2016 mid-year Top 100 Tours chart both in North America and worldwide respectively, with a total mid-year worldwide gross of $137.3 million from the first twenty-five shows (including $126.3 million from the first North American leg of the tour). In total, the tour grossed $256 million from forty-nine sold-out shows according to Billboard box score, and ranked at number two on Pollstar's 2016 Year-End Tours chart.

Accompanying film 

Lemonade was accompanied by the release of a sixty-five-minute film of the same title, produced by Good Company and Jonathan Lia, which premiered on HBO on April 23, 2016, logging 787,000 viewers. It is divided into eleven chapters, titled "Intuition", "Denial", "Anger", "Apathy", "Emptiness", "Accountability", "Reformation", "Forgiveness", "Resurrection", "Hope", and "Redemption".
The film uses poetry and prose written by British-Somali poet Warsan Shire; the poems adapted were "The Unbearable Weight of Staying", "Dear Moon", "How to Wear Your Mother's Lipstick", "Nail Technician as Palm Reader", and "For Women Who Are Difficult to Love".

The film's cast features Ibeyi, Laolu Senbanjo, Amandla Stenberg, Quvenzhané Wallis, Chloe x Halle, Zendaya and Serena Williams. In "Forward", the mothers of Trayvon Martin (Sybrina Fulton), Michael Brown (Lesley McFadden), and Eric Garner (Gwen Carr) are featured holding pictures of their deceased sons. Jay-Z and Beyoncé's daughter Blue Ivy appears in home video footage at one point, as does Jay-Z's grandmother Hattie White, and Beyoncé's mother Tina Knowles, who is shown with her second husband Richard Lawson on their wedding day in 2015. The film also samples work by Malcolm X, specifically an excerpt from his speech "Who Taught You to Hate Yourself", which is featured on the track "Don't Hurt Yourself".

The Lemonade film appeared on a number of critics' lists. Pitchfork listed Lemonade at number one on their list of best music videos of 2016.
It was also included on Sight & Sounds best films of 2016 list at number twenty-six. David Ehrlich, a film critic for IndieWire, placed Lemonade at number twenty-three on his Best Films of 2016 list. Jen Yamato from The Daily Beast ranked it at number nine on her list of the Top 10 Best Films of 2016. In June 2016, Matthew Fulks sued Beyoncé, Sony Music, Columbia Records and Parkwood Entertainment for allegedly lifting nine visual elements of his short film Palinoia for the trailer for Lemonade. The lawsuit was subsequently dismissed by New York federal judge Jed S. Rakoff, siding with the defendant.

Singles 
Lemonade consisted of five singles, three of which would become major hits. All twelve songs charted on the US Billboard Hot 100. "Formation" was released as the album's first single exclusively on Tidal on February 6, 2016, along with its accompanying music video. The song was part of the set Beyoncé performed the following day at the Super Bowl 50 halftime show. "Formation" peaked at number ten on the US Billboard Hot 100. The music video for the song was uploaded onto Vevo in December 2016.

"Sorry" was released as the second single and serviced to rhythmic adult contemporary radio in the United States on May 3, 2016, and its music video was uploaded onto Vevo on June 22, 2016. The single debuted and peaked at number eleven on the US Billboard Hot 100.

"Hold Up" was the third single and was first released to contemporary hit radio stations in Germany and the United Kingdom on May 12, 2016, and was later serviced to radio in the United States on August 16, 2016. It debuted and peaked at number thirteen on the US Billboard Hot 100. The music video for "Hold Up" was uploaded onto Vevo on September 4, 2016.

The fourth and fifth singles released were "Freedom" and "All Night", respectively. Both became moderate hits with the former (released September 2016) peaking at US number thirty-five, and the latter (released December 2016) peaking at US number thirty-eight.

Critical reception 

Lemonade received universal acclaim from music critics upon release, and is widely considered to be Beyoncé's magnum opus. At Metacritic, which assigns a normalized rating out of 100 to reviews from mainstream publications, the album received a weighted average score of 92, based on 33 reviews, indicating "universal acclaim".

In Spin, Greg Tate calls Lemonade "a triumph of marketing and musicality, spectacle and song, vision and collaboration, Borg-like assimilation, and — as of 2013 — the element of surprise". Lauding both the film and album, Tate writes "Visually, literarily, choreographically, cinematically, this full accessing of her Southern bona fides shows up in the HBO project as ritual evidence that Bey's spent her downtime delving into the avant-garde mysticism of black-feminist poetry, novel writing, dance, gallery art, and film... The album, however, is out to sonorously suck you into its gully gravitational orbit the old fashioned way, placing the burden of conjuration on its steamy witches' brew of beats, melodies, and heavy-hearted-to-merry-pranksterish vocal seductions. In her mastery of carnal and esoteric mysteries, Queen Bey raises the spirits, sizzles the flesh, and rallies her troops." AllMusic writer Andy Kellman called Lemonade "culturally seismic" through its "layers of meaning and references, and experienced en masse through its televised premiere", adding that "the cathartic and wounded moments here resonate in a manner matched by few, if any, of Beyoncé's contemporaries."

In a five-star review for Rolling Stone, Rob Sheffield calls Lemonade "a welcome reminder that giants still walk among us", describing it as an "album of emotional discord and marital meltdown... from the most respected and creative artist in the pop game". Sheffield writes "Lemonade is her most emotionally extreme music, but also her most sonically adventurous... Yet the most astounding sound is always Bey's voice", which is described as "her wildest, rawest vocals ever". Sheffield also compares Lemonade to Aretha Franklin’s Spirit in the Dark and Nina Simone’s Silk and Soul in the way that the album "reach[es] out historically, connecting her personal pain to the trauma of American blackness". Ray Rahman for Entertainment Weekly agrees, writing that Lemonade is "a raw and intensely personal plunge into the heart of marital darkness" as well as "a feminist blueprint, a tribute to women, African-Americans, and, especially, African-American women". Rahman further praises the diversity of the album: "[Beyoncé] can do rock, blues, country, avant-garde, whatever. Lemonade stands as Bey's most diverse album to date. Sinister strip-club-in-the-future R&B... sits right next to a slab of Texas twang. Led Zeppelin and Soulja Boy become bedfellows."

Alexis Petridis of The Guardian wrote that the album "feels like a success" and that Beyoncé sounded "genuinely imperious". Petridis praises the musical arc of the album, commenting on how the music "slowly works itself up into a righteous frenzy of anger, shifting from the becalmed misery of opener "Pray You Catch Me" via the sparse simmer of "Hold Up"... before finally boiling over on the fantastic "Don't Hurt Yourself": a ferocious, distorted vocal as commanding as anything she’s recorded". The Daily Telegraph writer Jonathan Bernstein felt it was her strongest work to date and "proves there's a thin line between love and hate." Nekesa Moody and Mohamad Soliman from The Washington Post called the album a "deeply personal, yet ... a bold social and political statement as well". Writing for The New York Times, Jon Pareles praised Beyoncé's vocals and her courage to talk about subjects that affect so many people, and noted that "the album is not beholden to radio formats or presold by a single". Greg Kot from the Chicago Tribune felt that "artistic advances" seem "slight" in context towards the record's "more personal, raw and relatable" aspects, where it came out as a "clearly conceived" piece of music, meaning it had a "unifying vision" for what may have lent itself to being "a prettily packaged hodgepodge".

Reviewing the album in The Independent, Everett True wrote that it "is fiery, insurgent, fiercely proud, sprawling and sharply focused in its dissatisfaction", with Beyoncé "pick[ing] up the mantles of both" Prince and Nina Simone. Writing for Slate, Carl Wilson describes Lemonade as "a spectacle to rival Thriller" and "a beautiful and often disturbing kaleidoscope of poetry, feminism, racial politics, history, mythology, emotional upheaval, family, and romance that can be watched again and again and will be for years to come". Kitty Empire of The Observer writes that "female endurance and pragmatism are celebrated with warmth, anger and wit on this astounding visual album" and that "it’s unlikely there will be many more albums this year that will unite high art and low in the same way as Beyoncé’s jaw-slackening latest". Jillian Mapes of Pitchfork wrote that "The increasingly signature cadence, patois, and all-around attitude on Lemonade speaks to her status as the hip-hop pop star—but this being Bey, she doesn’t stop there... Lemonade proves Beyoncé to also be a new kind of post-genre pop star". In The A.V. Club Annie Zaleski wrote that it was "yet another seismic step forward for Beyoncé as a musician" that "pushes pop music into smarter, deeper places".

Shahzaib Hussain, writing for Clash, stated: "Lemonade is Beyoncé at her most benevolent, and her most unadulterated. Treating her blackness not as an affliction but a celebratory beacon, Lemonade is a long overdue, cathartic retribution." Sal Cinquemani of Slant Magazine wrote that the album "is her most lyrically and thematically coherent effort to date." Maura Johnston of Time wrote that its tracks were "fresh yet instantly familiar" with an "over-the-top but intimate" sound. Jamie Milton of DIY wrote that "there's so much more than an enthralling story to draw out of this all-slaying work", where "Beyoncé can count herself as a risk-taker breaking new ground, up there with the bravest." Exclaim!s Erin Lowers wrote that "If you've ever been handed lemons, you need Lemonade", calling it "an album in which millions will find their own struggles reflected back to them, as therapeutic as it is utterly dazzling". Britt Julious of Consequence of Sound describes how "With nods to Voudou and Southern Black gothic storytelling, Lemonade, the visual album, wove chapters of emotional grief into a piece of art about the black woman... Separated from the visual, the album itself acts as dexterously as the film, exposing the rawest elements of Beyoncé’s personal life while framing it against the universal — the machinations of internal paranoia, the all-consuming well of fury and anger, and the bottomless depths of sadness." Julious continues by praising the song cycle nature of the album: "Taken as a whole, we hear the threads of this from song to song on the record. If Lemonade is a record about dismantling the cycles of abuse, ripping open the secrets we keep hidden (especially within the closely guarded black community), and finding healing, purpose, and even greatness in the process, then it is personified in the arcs of each track... The songs stand as joined entities, two dichotomous halves of the grief process". PopMatters writer Evan Sawdey felt few albums could ever be considered "as bold, complex, or resolute as Lemonade," and the BBC's Mark Savage, describing Lemonade as "an album with a complex narrative arc... that demands to be heard in one sitting", noted that Beyoncé had become an albums artist with a range extending beyond that of radio play.

Accolades 

At the end of 2016, Lemonade appeared on a number of critics' lists ranking the year's top albums. According to the BBC, it was the critics' top album of 2016, while according to Metacritic, it was the second most prominently ranked record of 2016, and the album that was listed at number one by the most publications (37 publications). Lemonade was ranked as the best album of the year by such publications as Rolling Stone, Billboard, Entertainment Weekly, The Guardian, Digital Spy, The Independent, The Associated Press, The New York Times (Jon Pareles list), Los Angeles Times (Mikael Wood list), Pop Matters, Pretty Much Amazing, Idolator, Stereogum, Complex, Consequence of Sound, Wired, and US Weekly. Paste, USA Today, NPR also included the release on their list of best albums of 2016. The album appeared within the top twenty of numerous publications year end lists including: Village Voices,Slant, Exclaim!, Spin, NME, FACT, Drowned in Sound, Uncut, Mojo, Q, and Pitchfork.

Lemonade was named the best album of the decade (2010s) by Consequence of Sound, The Associated Press and Spex. Lemonade was also named the best music video of the decade by The Daily Beast, as well as one of the best movies of the 2010s by Vox and the eleventh greatest film of the decade by Hyperallergic. Rolling Stone The Independent, New York Post, Billboard, Paste Magazine, The A.V. Club, WXPN The Key, and Refinery29 declared Lemonade the second best album of the 2010s. Lemonade was named the third best album of the decade by Tampa Bay Times, Insider, and The Young Folks, while the Genius community and Chris Willman for Variety named it the fourth best one. Uproxx, Noisey, The Independent, and The Wild Honey Pie named Lemonade the fifth best album of the decade. Pitchfork listed Lemonade as the 41st greatest album of the decade. Time, Paper, Stuff, and The Sydney Morning Herald included the album in their lists of the best 10 albums of the decade. Lemonade was included in The Atlantic's "Time Capsule of the 2010s". Lemonade was included in Triple J'''s top 15 biggest music moments of the decade list.Lemonade is the 26th best album of all time by Metacritic score. In 2020, Parade named Lemonade the best music video of all time. On Rolling Stone's 500 Greatest Albums of All Time list, Lemonade was placed at number 32, citing the album's exploration of "the betrayals of American blackness" and "all of the country's music traditions". BBC Radio 4's named Lemonade the eighth greatest risk in 21st century art, with the judges saying that Beyoncé "resisted the commercial pressure not to be political in order to stand up for what she believed in and let audiences into her personal life as never before". The Guardian listed it at number 25 on their ranking of the 100 best albums of the 21st century. On their list of the top 100 albums of the publication's existence, The Quietus named the project at number 9. In 2017, the album was ranked at number 6 on NPRs list of the 150 Greatest Albums Made By Women. Consequence of Sound named Lemonade the second best album of the last 15 years (2007–2022) and the 18th best one of all time.

 Awards 

"Formation" won in three categories at the 2016 BET Awards for Video of the Year, the Centric Award, and the Viewers Choice Award. At the 2017 BET Awards Beyoncé was nominated in 7 categories and won 5, including Album of the Year, Video of the Year for "Sorry" and Best Female R&B/Pop Artist. The Lemonade film was nominated for four Primetime Emmy Awards, including Outstanding Variety Special and Outstanding Directing for a Variety Special. From the four categories, Beyoncé was nominated in the two mentioned. The album's visuals received 11 nominations at the 2016 MTV Video Music Awards. They included Breakthrough Long Form Video for Lemonade, Video of the Year, Best Pop Video, Best Direction, Best Editing, and Best Cinematography for "Formation", Best Female Video and Best Art Direction for "Hold Up", and Best Choreography for "Sorry" and "Formation". Beyoncé went on to win eight of her nominations, including Video of the Year and Breakthrough Long Form Video.

She received two nominations at the 2016 MTV Video Music Awards Japan for Best Album of the Year for Lemonade and Best Female Video International for "Formation", eventually winning for Best Album of the Year. At the 2016 Soul Train Music Awards, Beyoncé was nominated for eight awards including Best Female Artist, Lemonade for Album of the Year, and "Formation" for Song and Video of the Year. Beyoncé went on to win all four awards. Lemonade won Best TV Show – Special or Limited Series at the African American Film Critics Association. At the 2017 NAACP Image Awards, Lemonade was nominated for Outstanding Album and Outstanding Variety – Series or Special, "Formation" was nominated for Outstanding Song and Outstanding Music Video, and "Freedom", featuring Kendrick Lamar, was nominated for Outstanding Duo, Group or Collaboration and Outstanding Song. The album received four awards, including Outstanding Album, Outstanding Song and Outstanding Duo, Group or Collaboration for "Freedom" and Outstanding Music Video for "Formation". At the 2016 ADG Excellence in Production Design Awards, Lemonade received the award for Best Awards or Event Special, as well as "Hold Up", "6 Inch" and "Denial" all being nominated for Best Short Format: Web Series, Music Video or Commercial.

At the 59th Annual Grammy Awards, Lemonade received three nominations: Album of the Year, Best Urban Contemporary Album and Best Music Film. "Formation" received three as well: Record of the Year, Song of the Year and Best Music Video. "Hold Up" was nominated for Best Pop Solo Performance, "Don't Hurt Yourself" for Best Rock Performance and "Freedom" for Best Rap/Sung Performance. Beyoncé went on to win two awards, Best Urban Contemporary Album and Best Music Video for "Formation". Lemonade won Outstanding Television Documentary or Special at the 2017 Black Reel Awards.Lemonade won a Peabody Award in Entertainment, along with the following description by the board of jurors:Adroitly bringing together stories about betrayal, renewal, and hope, Lemonade draws from the prolific literary, musical, cinematic, and aesthetic sensibilities of black cultural producers to create a rich tapestry of poetic innovation. Defying genre and convention, Lemonade immerses viewers in the sublime worlds of black women, family, and community where we experience poignant and compelling stories about the lives of women of color and the bonds of friendship seldom seen or heard in American popular culture. This innovative and stunningly beautiful masterpiece challenges us to readjust our visual and sonic antennae and invites a reckoning with taken for granted ideas about who we are. For the audacity of its reach and the fierceness of its vision in challenging our cultural imagination about the intimacies and complexities of women of color, we recognize Lemonade as a Peabody Award winner.

—The George Foster Peabody Awards Board of Jurors

 Commercial performance 
In the United States, Lemonade debuted at number one on the Billboard 200, with 653,000 album-equivalent units, out of which 485,000 were pure album sales. This made the highest opening-week sales for a female act of the year. Subsequently, she broke the record she previously tied with DMX, by becoming the first artist in the chart's history to have their first six studio albums debut at number one. In the same week, Beyoncé became the first female artist to chart twelve or more songs on the US Billboard Hot 100 at the same time, with every song on the album debuting on the chart. Additionally, Lemonade was streamed 115 million times via Tidal, setting a record for the most-streamed album in a single week by a female artist.

The album slipped from number one to number two in its second week, selling 321,000 album-equivalent units, out of which 196,000 were pure album sales. It remained at number two in its third week selling 201,000 album-equivalent units, out of which 153,000 were pure album sales. Lemonade was certified platinum by the Recording Industry Association of America (RIAA) in June 2016. According to Nielsen's 2016 year-end report, it had sold 1,554,000 copies and 2,187,000 album-equivalent units in the United States. Following its April 23, 2019 release on all streaming services, Lemonade returned to the top ten on the Billboard 200 at number nine, while its only added song, the original demo of "Sorry", debuted at number four on the US R&B Songs. On May 20, 2019, the album was certified double platinum for shipments of two million copies, and triple platinum on June 13, 2019, for shipments of three million copies. In Canada, the album debuted at number one with sales of 33,000 copies.

The album debuted at number one on the UK Albums Chart selling 73,000 copies in its first week of release, with 10,000 equivalent sales (14% of the total sales) accounting for streaming, marking the largest ever for a number-one album since the chart began including streaming. The album marked the singer's third number-one album on the chart and was certified platinum by the British Phonographic Industry (BPI) on September 9, 2016, for shipments of 300,000 copies. All of the album's tracks also debuted within the top hundred of the UK Singles Chart. As in the US, 2020 is the first year since release that the album has not appeared on the UK Chart.
In Australia, Lemonade sold 20,490 digital copies in its first week, debuting atop the Australian Albums Chart and becoming Beyoncé's second consecutive number-one album in the country. It received a platinum certification from the Australian Recording Industry Association (ARIA) for shipments of 70,000 copies.Lemonade also peaked atop the charts in numerous European and Oceanic countries including Ireland and Belgium, where it spent five and seven weeks at the summit, respectively, Croatia, the Czech Republic, the Netherlands, New Zealand, Norway, Portugal, Scotland and Sweden. In Brazil, it debuted at number one and received a platinum certification from Pro-Música Brasil.

 Impact and legacy 
 Music industry Lemonade has been credited with reviving the concept of an album in an era dominated by singles and streaming, and popularizing releasing albums with accompanying films. Jamieson Cox for The Verge called Lemonade "the endpoint of a slow shift toward cohesive, self-centered pop albums", writing that "it’s setting a new standard for pop storytelling at the highest possible scale". Megan Carpentier of The Guardian wrote that Lemonade has "almost revived the album format" as "an immersive, densely textured large-scale work" that can only be listened to in its entirety. Myf Warhurst on Double J's "Lunch With Myf" explained that Beyoncé "changed [the album] to a narrative with an arc and a story and you have to listen to the entire thing to get the concept". The New York Times Katherine Schulten agreed, asking "How do you talk about the ongoing evolution of the music video and the autobiographical album without holding up Lemonade as an exemplar of both forms?" Joe Coscarelli of The New York Times describes how "some brand-name acts are following Beyoncé’s blueprint with high-concept mini-movies that can add artistic heft to projects," with Frank Ocean's Endless and Drake's Please Forgive Me cited as examples of artists' projects inspired by Lemonade. Other projects said to have followed the precedent that Lemonade set include Lonely Island's The Unauthorized Bash Brothers Experience, Thom Yorke's Anima, Sturgill Simpson's Sound & Fury, and Kid Cudi's Entergalactic, which were all albums released with complementary film projects.Beyoncé's use of various genres on Lemonade has been credited with setting the precedent for music to transcend genre, with NPR writing that the album "leads us to this moment where post-genre becomes a thing". The use of various genres has also been credited with kickstarting the reclamation of certain genres by black people. "Daddy Lessons" has been credited as starting a trend of "pop stars toying with American West and Southern aesthetics," as well as setting the precedent for "The Yeehaw Agenda," the trend of reclaiming black cowboy culture through music and fashion. "Don't Hurt Yourself" has been credited with the reclaiming of rock by black women, with Brittany Spanos for Rolling Stone writing that "the re-imagination of what rock can be and who can sing it by Beyoncé and her superstar peers is giving the genre a second life – and may be what can save it."

 Contemporaries 
Several musicians were inspired by Lemonade. American rapper Snoop Dogg named his fourteenth studio album Coolaid (2016) after Lemonade. British girl group Little Mix cited Lemonade as an inspiration for their album Glory Days (2016). American rapper Cardi B was inspired by Lemonade for her upcoming album, which she says is "going to have my Lemonade moments". Naming Lemonade one of her favorite albums ever, English singer-songwriter Ellie Rowsell of Wolf Alice said that it helped her to "put in more thought to what makes a good album flow". American singer The-Dream wrote a response to Lemonade titled "Lemon Lean" in his EP Love You to Death, saying that the album changed the way people think about their relationships. American singer Lauren Jenkins used Lemonade as the inspiration for her album and long-form music video No Saint. American comedian Lahna Turner released a visual album entitled Limeade in homage to Lemonade. American singer Matt Palmer was inspired by Lemonade to create his visual EP Get Lost. American musician Todrick Hall's second studio album Straight Outta Oz was made as a visual album due to Lemonade. British singer-songwriter Arrow Benjamin was also inspired by Lemonade for his 2016 EP W.A.R. (We All Rise), saying: "Every piece on this project was created from a visual, so that's why I was extremely inspired when I saw Lemonade."

Ann Powers for NPR opined that Fiona Apple was influenced by Lemonade when implementing black musical traditions on her 2020 album Fetch the Bolt Cutters, while Jenna Wortham for The New York Times drew a parallel between both albums as "blueprints for how to take in all that emotion and kind of how to push it back out in a way that’s cathartic and constructive". Dan Weiss of Billboard wrote that Shania Twain's Now "couldn't have existed without" Lemonade, as an album that "completely changed the course of breakup album history" in which the artist is "someone at their full creative peak pushing herself into new niches, dominating new musical territories." Kadeen Griffiths from Bustle states that Lemonade, as an album that deals with issues related to black women, "paved the way" for Alicia Keys' Here and Solange's A Seat at the Table. Danielle Koku for The Guardian stated that Lemonade aided the return of African mysticism to pop music, writing: "By taking African mysticism to the world stage, Beyoncé stripped it of its ancient pagan labels." Many critics have noted that Jay-Z's thirteenth studio album 4:44 (2017) is a response to Lemonade, with Jay-Z referencing lines from Lemonade, such as the "You better call Becky with the good hair" line on Beyoncé's "Sorry", with Jay-Z retorting: "Let me alone, Becky" in "Family Feud".

At the 59th Annual Grammy Awards (2017), Adele dedicated her Album of the Year award to Beyoncé and said: "The artist of my life is Beyoncé... the Lemonade album, is just so monumental." In a 2021 interview with Vogue, Adele claimed that Beyoncé should have won the said award instead of her. After the show, she went into Beyoncé's dressing room and "said to her, like, the way that the Grammys works, and the people who control it at the very, very top—they don't know what a visual album is. They don't want to support the way that she's moving things forward with her releases and the things that she's talking about." She revealed that the award she received in the mail was broken and that she wedged a lemon into the broken part, and went on to claim that, "[f]or [her] friends who are women of color, [Lemonade] was such a huge acknowledgment for them, of the sort of undermined grief that they go through." American musician Stevie Wonder called Lemonade "a great work, a great art piece". U2's Bono included "Freedom" in his "60 Songs That Saved My Life" project to celebrate his 60th birthday, writing: "In my 60 years, I was served many platters but rarely one like the Queen Bey's album Lemonade."

 Cultural impact 

 Art and literature Lemonade has inspired artists in media other than music, including art, literature, film, television and theatre. Misha Green, creator of the 2020 television series Lovecraft Country, described how Lemonade inspired the direction and flow of the show's score, saying: "What Beyoncé did on Lemonade, with bringing in the poems and taking us on this collage of a journey, that wasn’t just music and visuals. [It was] also words and really using those words as a score." Bill Condon, director of the film Beauty and the Beast (2017) says the visuals behind Lemonade inspired him for the movie: "You look at Beyoncé's brilliant movie Lemonade, this genre is taking on so many different forms… I do think that this very old-school break-out-into-song traditional musical is something that people understand again and really want.".

The Royal National Theatre's 2018 production of Shakespeare's Antony and Cleopatra featured a costume inspired by Lemonade, with costume designer Evie Gurney describing how she wanted to draw a parallel between Cleopatra and Beyoncé, as the latter is "a woman in the public eye who was subject to a lot of scrutiny [and] actually created a platform for herself to take back the narrative of her own story, and it was an extraordinary act of power." The character of Catherine of Aragon in the West End and Broadway musical Six was inspired by "Lemonade-era Beyoncé". Ellie Kenrick's 2018 play Hole at the Royal Court was described by its directors as "a stage version of Beyoncé’s Lemonade album", as an artwork about feminism and historical oppression of women that consists of song, dance and spoken word.

Fashion stylist Salvador Camarena paid homage to Lemonade by designing a room dedicated to the album during Modernism Week, saying "That album is such a visually stunning album. There are so many iconic looks from the video, I kind of wanted to implement that world into that room." The young adult anthology A Phoenix First Must Burn edited by Patrice Caldwell, which explores "the Black experience through fantasy, science fiction, and magic", has the aim of "evoking Beyoncé’s Lemonade for a teen audience". A 2017 video game titled "Lemonade Rage" was created in homage to Lemonade and the "Hold Up" music video. The cover of Marvel's 2017 America comic book paid homage to the "Formation" music video, with its illustrator saying "America is a comic that is all about representation, feminism and fighting for what’s right... I could think of no better parallel than Beyoncé."

 Trends 
Sales for Warsan Shire's chapbook "Teaching My Mother How to Give Birth" increased by 700 to 800% after her poetry was included in the Lemonade film. Beyoncé's mention of Red Lobster in "Formation" increased sales at the restaurant chain by 33%, which made employees rename popular menu items after Beyoncé and call the effect the "Beyoncé Bounce". Designers of the costumes that Beyoncé wore in the Lemonade film spoke with Complex about the impact that this had on their careers; for example, Natalia Fedner, who designed Beyoncé's dress for "Hold Up", stated that because of the dress's inclusion in Lemonade, "I was on 'Entertainment Tonight' being hailed as a 'designer to watch'." The inclusion of imagery from the 1991 film Daughters of the Dust in the visuals for Lemonade helped bring the film back to theatres, with director Julie Dash stating that Lemonade "just took me places that I had not been seeing in a long, long time. It just re-confirmed a lot of things that I know to be true about visual style and visual metaphors. And the use of visual metaphors in creating, redefining, and re-framing a Creole culture within this new world."

The popular "Lemonade braids" hairstyle worn by black women is named after a hairstyle that Beyoncé wore in Lemonade. Georgia Murray for Refinery29 sourced the 2020 fashion trend of wearing yellow to Lemonade, writing that Beyoncé's yellow dress in "Hold Up" "kickstarted an obsession with yellow that we’re still seeing the effects of today". The use of the lemon and bee emojis increased due to the release of Lemonade, with a Twitter spokesperson telling Time: "Before Lemonade, the lemon emoji had no meaning. Since the launch of Lemonade, the emoji has taken on a meaning of its own". The MTV Video Music Award for Breakthrough Long Form Video, which Beyoncé ultimately won at the 2016 MTV Video Music Awards, was reintroduced after 25 years due to the Lemonade film.

 Parodies and homages Lemonade was parodied and was paid homage to in various media. In an episode of Unbreakable Kimmy Schmidt titled "Kimmy's Roommate Lemonades!", character Titus Andromedon parodied the videos for "Hold Up", "Sorry" and "All Night" after he suspects his boyfriend of infidelity, coining the term "Lemonading". This episode was subsequently nominated for two Emmy Awards: Outstanding Original Music And Lyrics for the "Hold Up" parody "Hell No", and Outstanding Supporting Actor In A Comedy Series for Tituss Burgess. The "Hold Up" music video was also paid homage to in The Simpsons, Making a Scene with James Franco, The Ellen DeGeneres Show, The Late Show with Stephen Colbert, and The Daily Show.SNL produced two sketches on Lemonade: one entitled "The Day Beyoncé Turned Black" after Beyoncé released the "unapologetically black" "Formation", and the other entitled "Melanianade" which parodied the "Sorry" music video featuring impersonations of Donald Trump's female family members and aides. In a Late Night with Seth Meyers sketch titled "Beyoncé Lemonade Late Night Aftermath", females staffers empowered by Lemonade paid homage to the visuals, costumes, songs and poetry featured in the film. The Late Late Show with James Corden produced a parody entitled "Lemonjames: A Visual Monologue", where James Corden gave his monologue by recreating parts of the Lemonade film such as the "Pray You Catch Me", "Don't Hurt Yourself" and "6 Inch" music videos. Actress Goldie Hawn and comedian Amy Schumer produced a parody of "Formation". The Season 2 premiere of Crazy Ex-Girlfriend featured a musical number that was an homage to Lemonade, including parodies of "Formation" and "Pray You Catch Me".

For Beyoncé's 36th birthday, various black female public figures recreated a costume that Beyoncé wore in the "Formation" music video, including Michelle Obama and Serena Williams. The first episode of British comedian James Acaster's 2020 podcast titled Perfect Sounds (in which Acaster discusses why 2016 was the greatest year in music with various comedians) featured Romesh Ranganathan and focused on "the genius of Lemonade".

 Intellectual response Lemonade has also received notable attention from scholars and authors outside the music industry. In partnership with the Zora Neale Hurston Festival of the Arts and Humanities, a talk at Seminole State College "discussed how Beyoncé embodies the conjure woman in her iconic audiovisual work Lemonade as a contemporary revision of Zora Neale Hurston’s groundbreaking study of conjure and its place in Black women’s spirit work." Museum of Design Atlanta (MODA) announced "The Lemonade Project", a twelve-month series of conversations centered around the visual album. The series will explore the themes of race, gender and class addressed by the album.

Kinitra Brooks and Kameelah Martin have produced "The Lemonade Reader", described as "an educational tool to support and guide discussions of the visual album at postgraduate and undergraduate levels, [which] critiques Lemonade’s multiple Afrodiasporic influences, visual aesthetics, narrative arc of grief and healing, and ethnomusicological reach." University of Texas at Austin professor Omise’eke Tinsley wrote a book entitled "Beyoncé in Formation: Remixing Black Feminism" that was released in 2018, which "analyzes Beyoncé’s visual album, Lemonade, in relation to the sexuality and gender of Black women". University of Albany professor Janell Hobson produced a lesson plan based on her class on Lemonade, saying "Beyoncé’s Lemonade stimulates class discussions and assignments as a highly visible pop project striving to create deeper conversations on the meanings of Blackness, womanhood, and feminism." Dissect Podcast have since dedicated their sixth season to "Beyoncé’s masterwork Lemonade." The host, Cole Cuchna and cohost Titi Shodiya, "make leaps of interpretative wonder, fusing insights, music theory, instrumentation, and lyric interpretation with social analysis to empower fans to build deeper connections with Beyoncé’s artistry."

 Race and identity 
In a 2020 New York Times article titled "The African-American Art Shaping the 21st Century", which contained 35 prominent black artists talking about the work that inspires them most, American actress Kerry Washington relayed about Lemonade as a game changer "visually, musically, but also sociopolitically, and anthropologically. The release of "Formation" and the consequent performance at the Super Bowl 50 halftime show caused both conversation and controversy due to its "unapologetic Blackness". Many articles and think pieces were produced discussing the importance and meaning of the song and performance, such as the BBC, who produced an article entitled "Beyoncé's Super Bowl performance: Why was it so significant?", and TheWrap, who produced an article entitled "Why Beyoncé's Formation’ Matters So Much: A Perfectly Choreographed Political Debut Before 112 Million." Lemonade as a whole also inspired many think pieces, particularly written by black women, that analyze the messages and significance of the album, such as Miriam Bale for Billboard who named Lemonade "a revolutionary work of black feminism".

Megan Carpentier of The Guardian named the album "a pop culture phenomenon" and wrote: "It is not an exaggeration to say that there is no other living musical artist who could ignite such a broad and unavoidable conversation just by releasing a new album – even a visual one." Writing in the same publication, Syreeta McFadden noted that the "Formation" video depicts archetypal southern Black women "in ways that we haven't seen frequently represented in popular art or culture". Melissa Harris-Perry of Time magazine said that "Beyoncé publicly embraced explicitly feminist Blackness at a politically risky moment."

 Academic study 
Since its release, the album has spawned a large syllabus of literature and academic studies. The University of Texas at San Antonio offered a class in the Fall of 2016 based on the album. The course, titled "Black Women, Beyoncé and Popular Culture", explored how the visual album "is a meditation on contemporary Black womanhood," before advancing and diving into the "theoretical, historical, and literary frameworks of Black feminism," according to the syllabus.
The University of Tennessee at Chattanooga hosted a "Lemonade Week" in April 2017, which featured discussions on feminism, theatrical performances, celebrations of African-American women writers and poets, and choreography tutorials. Harvard University hosted "The Lemon Drop": a discussion that explored the nuances of Lemonade. University of Arkansas offered a course that analysed the influence of Black feminism on Beyoncé and Lemonade. University of Pennsylvania ran two courses that explored politics, race and gender through the study of Lemonade.

Michigan State University hosted a discussion on Lemonade as part of their series for "exchanging ideas and exploring the lived experiences of underrepresented and marginalized communities".
Chatham University based a writing class on Lemonade, where "students get to examine how they fit into the power systems around them". Valdosta State University offered a course on Lemonade, "unpacking the many themes found in "Lemonade," including Black identity, feminism, marital infidelity, sisterhood, and faith." The College of Charleston hosted a discussion by Black feminist scholars, exploring "Beyoncé's use of southern landscape, Black women, music, and African-based spirituality". University of North Georgia offered a class entitled "Okay, Ladies, Now Let’s Get in Formation: Intersectional Feminism in Beyoncé’s Lemonade" that explored the music, lyrics and visuals of Lemonade.

 Track listing 

Notes
  signifies a co-producer.
  signifies an additional producer.
  signifies an additional director.

 Sample credits 
 "Hold Up"
 contains elements of "Can't Get Used to Losing You", performed by Andy Williams, written by Doc Pomus and Mort Shuman
 embodies portions of "Turn My Swag On", performed by Soulja Boy, written by DeAndre Way, Antonio Randolph and Kelvin McConnell
 contains elements of "Maps", performed by the Yeah Yeah Yeahs, written by Brian Chase, Karen Orzolek and Nick Zinner.
 "Don't Hurt Yourself"
 features samples from "When the Levee Breaks", performed by Led Zeppelin, written by James Page, Robert Plant, John Paul Jones and John Bonham.
 "6 Inch"
 embodies portions of "My Girls", performed by Animal Collective, written by Dave Portner, Noah Lennox and Brian Weitz
 contains samples from "Walk On By", performed by Isaac Hayes, written by Burt Bacharach and Hal David.
 "Freedom"
 contains a sample of "Let Me Try", performed by Kaleidoscope, written by Frank Tirado
 contains a sample of "Collection Speech/Unidentified Lining Hymn", performed by Reverend R.C. Crenshaw, recorded by Alan Lomax
 contains a sample of "Stewball", performed by Prisoner "22" at Mississippi State Penitentiary at Parchman, recorded by Alan Lomax and John Lomax, Sr.
 "All Night"
 contains elements of "SpottieOttieDopaliscious", performed by OutKast, written by André Benjamin, Antwan Patton and Patrick Brown.
 "Sorry (original demo)"
 interpolates "Young, Wild & Free", as performed by Snoop Dogg, Wiz Khalifa and Bruno Mars.
 Lemonade''
 contains a sample of "The Court of the Crimson King", performed by King Crimson, written by Ian McDonald and Peter Sinfield.

Personnel 
Credits from the album's liner notes, Beyoncé's official website, and Spotify

Musicians

 Beyoncé                                – vocals 
 Jack White                             – vocals & bass guitar 
 The Weeknd                             – vocals 
 James Blake     – vocals & piano ; jupiter bass 
 Kendrick Lamar                         – vocals 
 MeLo-X                                 – background vocals 
 Ruby Amanfu                            – background vocals 
 Chrissy Collins                            – background vocals 
 Belly                   – additional vocals 
 Arrow Benjamin                         – background vocals 
 Diplo                                  – background vocals ; drum programming 
 King Henry       – background vocals, drum programming & guitar 
 Jr Blender                                 – drum programming & guitar 
 Derek Dixie                                – drum programming ; additional instrumentation ; drums & band session leading ; horns arrangement 
 Mike Dean  – drum programming & keyboards 
 Patrick Keeler                         – drums 
 Jon Brion                              – string arrangements 
 Eric Gorfain                           – strings & orchestrations 
 Daphne Chen                                – strings 
 Charlie Bisharat                           – strings 
 Josefina Vergara                           – strings 
 Songa Lee                                  – strings 
 Marisa Kuney                               – strings 
 Neel Hammond                               – strings 
 Susan Chatman                              – strings 
 Katie Sloan                                – strings 
 Amy Wickman                                – strings 
 Lisa Dondlinger                            – strings 
 Terry Glenny                               – strings 
 Ina Veli                                   – strings 
 Gina Kronstadt                             – strings 
 Yelena Yegoryan                            – strings 
 Radu Pieptea                               – strings 
 Crystal Alforque                           – strings 
 Serena McKinney                            – strings 
 Leah Katz                                  – strings 
 Alma Fernandez                             – strings 
 Rodney Wirtz                               – strings 
 Briana Bandy                               – strings 
 Anna Bulbrook                          – strings 
 Grace Park                                 – strings 
 Richard Dodd                               – strings 
 John Krovoza                               – strings 
 Ira Glansbeek                              – strings 
 Vanessa Fairbairn-Smith                    – strings 
 Ginger Murphy                              – strings 
 Adrienne Woods                             – strings 
 Denise Briese                              – strings 
 Ryan Cross                                 – strings 
 Geoff Osika                                – strings 
 Fats Kaplan                                – strings 
 Lindsey Smith-Trestle                      – strings 
 Mark Watrous                           – strings & hammond organ 
 Randolph Ellis                             – horns 
 Peter Ortega                               – horns 
 Christopher Gray                           – horns 
 Richard Lucchese                           – horns 
 Patrick Williams                           – harmonica 
 Eric Walls                                 – guitar 
 Courtney Leonard                           – bass 
 Marcus Miller                          – bass 
 Jack Chambazyan                            – synths 
 Boots                 – synth arrangement ; additional programming 
 B. Carr                                    – additional programming 
 Too Many Zooz                          – additional instrumentation 
 Myles William                              – additional programming 
 Matt Doe                                   – trumpet 
 Swae Lee                               – ad-libs 
 Big Freedia                            – additional background ad-libs 
 Kevin Garrett – piano 
 Vincent Berry II                           – piano 
 Canei Finch                                – additional piano 

Technical

 Beyoncé                                 – vocal production ; executive production
 Greg Koller                             – string engineering ; keyboard engineering ; bass engineering 
 Stuart White                            – recording & engineering ; mixing ; additional production 
 Vance Powell                        – recording 
 Joshua V. Smith                         – recording, additional overdubs & Pro Tools editing recording 
 Ramon Rivas                         – second engineering 
 Mike Dean                               – engineering 
 Derek Dixie                             – assistant recording engineering 
 Eric Caudieux                       – Pro Tools editing recording ; keyboard recording 
 Jon Shacter                             – engineering assistance 
 Lester Mendoza                          – additional instrumentation recording ; band recording engineering ; horn recording 
 Ed Spear                                – additional studio assistance 
 Tony Maserati                       – mixing 
 Jaycen Joshua                       – mixing 
 John Cranfield                          – assistant recording engineering , assistant mix engineering 
 Tyler Scott                             – assistant mix engineering 
 James Krausse                           – assistant mix engineering 
 Miles Comaskey                          – assistant mix engineering 
 Arthur Chambazyan                       – assistant mix engineering ; studio assistance 
 David Nakaji                            – assistant mix engineering 
 Maddox Chhim                            – assistant mix engineering 
 Dave Kutch                              – mastering 
 Teresa LaBarbera Whites                 – A&R executive

Charts

Weekly charts

Year-end charts

Decade-end charts

Certifications and sales

Release history

See also 

 Album era
 List of Billboard 200 number-one albums of 2016
 List of Billboard number-one R&B/hip-hop albums of 2016
 List of number-one albums of 2016 (Australia)
 List of number-one albums of 2016 (Belgium)
 List of number-one albums of 2016 (Canada)
 List of number-one albums of the 2010s (Czech Republic)
 List of number-one albums of 2016 (Ireland)
 List of number-one albums in Norway
 List of number-one albums of 2016 (Portugal)
 List of number-one singles and albums in Sweden
 List of UK Albums Chart number ones of the 2010s
 List of UK R&B Albums Chart number ones of 2016

References

External links 
 
 Beyoncé's 'Lemonade' and Information Resources, a Resource Guide from the Maryland Institute College of Art
 

2010s musical films
2016 albums
Albums produced by Diplo
Albums produced by Jack White
Albums produced by Just Blaze
Albums produced by Mike Will Made It
Albums produced by James Blake (musician)
Albums recorded at Record Plant (Los Angeles)
Art pop albums
Beyoncé albums
Beyoncé video albums
Columbia Records albums
Concept albums
Films directed by Beyoncé
Peabody Award-winning broadcasts
Grammy Award for Best Urban Contemporary Album
Albums produced by Beyoncé
Surprise albums
Visual albums